Bibek Kumar Yadav (born 7 October 2003) is a Nepalese cricketer who plays for the Nepal national team. In February 2022, he was named in Nepal's Twenty20 International (T20I) squad for the 2021–22 Oman Quadrangular Series. Yadav made his T20I debut on 11 February 2022, for Nepal against Oman. In March 2022, he was named in Nepal's One Day International (ODI) squad for the 2022 United Arab Emirates Tri-Nation Series. He has been representing Madhesh Province Cricket Team in domestic cricket.

References

External links

2003 births
Living people
Nepalese cricketers
People from Saptari District
Nepal Twenty20 International cricketers
People from Madhesh Province